Nematoplanidae is a family of flatworms belonging to the order Proseriata.

Genera:
 Ezoplana  Tajika, 1982
 Nematoplana  Meixner, 1938
 Tabaota  Marcus, 1950
 Togarma  Marcus, 1949

References

Platyhelminthes